Warm Showers (WS) is a non-profit hospitality exchange service for people engaging in bicycle touring. The platform is a gift economy — hosts are not supposed to charge for lodging and are not bound.  The legal form is a Colorado 501(c)(3) nonprofit organization headquartered in Boulder, Colorado, USA.

The platform has been described as a "cyclists’ support network whose members may offer free amenities and services such as meals and lodging". Rough Guides recommends Warm Showers as means to improve security of solo female cyclists. Warm Showers helps bicycle travelers to balance the self-reliance of camping and hotels with opportunities for social encounters. Warm Showers has a positive effect on rural communities, both socially and economically. Many users of the platform cycle for health reasons or to reduce their carbon footprint and to be environmentally friendly. Cultural exchange and social connection do also play a role.

The organization received donations of $100,641 in 2015, $84,009 in 2016, $115,324 in 2017, $128,626 in 2018 and $111,089 in 2019.

History
The concept was inspired by cyclist John Mosley in 1976 by placing an ad in the U.S. magazine Bike World, which requested to sign up for a hospitality list. A list of 800 names and contact infos was put into a rolodex for almost 30 years. The name of the organization was Touring Cyclist Hospitality Directory back then. Mosley provided touring cyclists with copies of pages from the rolodex.

A Canadian couple, Terry Zmrhal and Geoff Cashmen, founded Warm Showers in 1993 as a continuation of Touring Cyclist Hospitality Directory. They created a database from the existing members of biking-hospitality organizations. In 1996, Roger Gravel became responsible for the platform. In 2005, Randy Fay created the website based on the existing database. 

As of 2018, Seth Portner was the executive director of Warm Showers. In 2019, Tahverlee Anglen provided management services.

Membership statistics

In 2018, 53% of members were based in Europe and 30% in Northamerica.

Homestay requests
Warm Showers grants trustworthy teams of scientists access to its anonymized data for publication of insights to the benefit of humanity. In 2015, an analysis of 97,915 homestay requests from BeWelcome and 285,444 homestay requests from Warm Showers showed general regularity — the less time is spent on writing a homestay request, the lower is the probability of success. Since both networks are shaped by altruism, low-effort communication, aka 'copy and paste requests', evidently sends the wrong signal.

References

External links
 
 Randy Fay and Kevin O'Leary introduce Warmshowers.org in 2010 via YouTube

Hospitality exchange services
1993 establishments in Canada
501(c)(3) organizations
Free and open-source software
Non-profit_organizations_based_in_Colorado
Organizations established in 1993
Cycling organizations
Ecotourism